Isaacman is a surname. 

People with this name include:

 Alan Isaacman (born 1942), U.S. lawyer
 Allen Isaacman, U.S. historian
 Jared Isaacman, U.S. businessman, world-record pilot
 Sonia Bunting (1922–2001, born Sonia Beryl Isaacman), South African journalist and anti-apartheid activist
 Zachary R. Isaacman, a 2010 school shooter, see List of school shootings in the United States

See also

 Isaacs (surname)
 Isaacson
 
 Isaac (disambiguation)
 Man (disambiguation)